Atkinson Township is one of twenty-four townships in Henry County, Illinois, USA.  As of the 2010 census, its population was 1,274 and it contained 592 housing units.

Geography

Cities, towns, villages
 Atkinson (partial)

Adjacent townships
 Loraine Township (north)
 Yorktown Township (northeast)
 Alba Township (east)
 Annawan Township (southeast)
 Cornwall Township (south)
 Munson Township (southwest)
 Geneseo Township (west)
 Phenix Township (northwest)

Cemeteries
The township contains Spring Creek Cemetery.

Major highways
  Interstate 80
  U.S. Route 6

Landmarks
 Hennepin Canal Parkway State Park (west half)

Demographics

School districts
 Geneseo Community Unit School District 228

Political districts
 Illinois's 14th congressional district
 State House District 90
 State Senate District 45

References
 
 United States Census Bureau 2008 TIGER/Line Shapefiles
 United States National Atlas

External links
 City-Data.com
 Illinois State Archives
 Township Officials of Illinois

Townships in Henry County, Illinois
Townships in Illinois